Pozzuolo can refer to various places in Italy: 
 Pozzuolo del Friuli, comune in Friuli-Venezia Giulia, Italy
 Battle of Pozzuolo del Friuli
 Cavalry Brigade "Pozzuolo del Friuli"
 Pozzuolo Martesana, comune in Lombardy, Italy
 Pozzuolo Martesana railway station
Pozzuolo Umbro, a frazione of the comune of Castiglione del Lago in central Italy

People with the surname
Gabriella Pozzuolo (born 1946), Italian gymnast

See also 

 Pozzuoli